Toby Joe Everett (born 22 December 1995) is an English professional rugby league footballer who plays as a  or  for the Keighley Cougars in the Betfred Championship. In 2022 Everett played on loan at Keighley Cougars in League 1 before making a permanent move to the club towards the end of the 2022 season.

He has previously played for the London Broncos in the Super League and the RFL Championship. Everett spent time on loan from the Broncos at the London Skolars, Hemel Stags and the Toronto Wolfpack in League 1. He has also played for the Dewsbury Rams and the Batley Bulldogs in the Championship.

Background
Everett was born in Farnborough, Hampshire, England.

Career
Everett signed London Broncos in 2014 and made 22 appearances in 2014 an 2015. The following season he spent most of the season on loan at  London Skolars and Hemel Stags. 

Signing for Toronto Wolfpack for 2017 he only made three appearances due to rehabilitation for an injury.  A move to Dewsbury Rams part way through 2017 saw him make 36 appearances for the Rams before a move to neighbours Batley Bulldogs at the end of the 2018 season.

The following three seasons saw Everett play 55 games for Batley but finding game time harder to come by in the 2022 season, he joined League 1 side Keighley Cougars on loan and played 14 matches for Keighley as they won the League 1 title. At the end of 2022 he signed a permanent contract with the Cougars.

References

1995 births
Living people
Batley Bulldogs players
Dewsbury Rams players
English rugby league players
Hemel Stags players
Keighley Cougars players
London Broncos players
London Skolars players
People from Farnborough, Hampshire
Rugby league locks
Rugby league players from Hampshire
Rugby league props
Toronto Wolfpack players